Drunken Lullabies is a 2002 album by the Irish-American punk band Flogging Molly. Their first album to feature guitarist Dennis Casey, it reached number 157 on the Billboard charts. It has since been certified gold by the Recording Industry Association of America (RIAA).

The title track "Drunken Lullabies" was featured on the soundtrack of the video game Tony Hawk's Pro Skater 4.

Reception
AllMusic gave the album a positive review. The review called the title track a standout and noted its themes of "decrying the ills of modern society" as well as its "breakneck speed". It also referred to the song "Death Valley Queen" as a "dirge of Dylanesque proportions." The reviewer concluded that "After one listen, you'll probably wish you were Irish."
In a four-star review, Punknews.org said that Flogging Molly "sounds authentic" and named "What's Left of the Flag", "Rebels of the Sacred Heart" and "The Rare Ould Times" as the standout tracks.

Track listing

Personnel
Dave King – lead vocals, acoustic guitar, banjo, bodhran, spoons, backing vocals
Bridget Regan – fiddle, tin whistle, uilleann pipes, backing vocals
Dennis Casey – electric guitar, backing vocals
Matt Hensley – accordion
Nathen Maxwell – bass, backing vocals, lead vocal on "Cruel Mistress"
Bob Schmidt – mandolin, banjo, bazouki, backing vocals
George Schwindt – drums

Charts

References

Flogging Molly albums
2002 albums
SideOneDummy Records albums